Viliami Sikalamu "Sika" Manu (born 22 January 1987) is a former professional rugby league footballer who played as a  forward for Tonga and New Zealand at international level, being a member of the World Cup winning Kiwi team who beat Australia in the 2008 World Cup Final.

At club level played for the Melbourne Storm, with whom he won the 2012 NRL Grand Final, and also the Penrith Panthers in the NRL and Hull F.C. in the Super League.

Background
He was born in Wellington, New Zealand.

Manu is of full Tongan descent and as a result is eligible both for New Zealand and Tonga. His older brother Filipe was also contracted to the Storm. He is cousin to the Super 15 Rugby union player from the Highlanders, Nasi Manu. He is also cousin to up and coming Rugby superstar David Manu, located in the Eastern Suburbs.Manu was educated at Upper Hutt College, where he played for the school's First XV rugby team.

Playing career

Early career
He played for the Randwick Kingfishers, Petone Panthers and the Upper Hutt Tigers in the Wellington Rugby League. Manu was a part of the 2004 Junior Kiwi side who twice defeated the England Under 18s Academy. Following this series, Manu signed a NRL contract with the Melbourne Storm.

Melbourne Storm
Manu made his first National Rugby League (NRL) for the Melbourne Storm in 2007. He has since played over 50 games for the club. He played in the 2008 NRL Grand Final defeat by Manly.

Manu suffered a leg injury in the Storm's 2009 Round 21 clash with the St George Illawarra Dragons, thus ending his season. He ultimately missed the Grand Final win. Manu was selected to play for New Zealand from the interchange bench in their loss against Australia. On 30 September 2012 he finally played in a premiership, when Storm beat the Canterbury-Bankstown Bulldogs 14-4 in the 2012 NRL Grand Final.

Penrith Panthers
On 5 June 2012 Penrith Panthers General Manager Phil Gould announced that Manu had signed a three-year deal with the Penrith club, commencing from the start of the 2013 National Rugby League season.

Hull F.C.
On 13 August 2015, he signed a 3-year contract with Super League team Hull F.C. starting in 2016.

He played in the 2016 Challenge Cup Final victory over the Warrington Wolves at Wembley Stadium.

He played in the 2017 Challenge Cup Final victory over the Wigan Warriors at Wembley Stadium.

International career

New Zealand
Manu made his New Zealand national rugby league team debut in 2008. He was named in the Tongan and New Zealand training squads for the 2008 Rugby League World Cup. In October 2008 he was named in the final 24-man Kiwi squad and was part of the team that went on to win the tournament.

Tonga
In 2013 Sika, through his Tongan heritage, he made his début for Tonga in their Pacific Rugby League International clash with fierce Pacific rivals Samoa.

Later in the year Sika represented Tonga in their unsuccessful 2013 Rugby League World Cup campaign. He played in all 3 of Tonga's matches, scoring two tries. He scored both of his tries in New Zealand's nail-biting 2 point defeat by Scotland (unfortunately the only defeat of their World Cup campaign which ultimately ended Tonga's hopes of a knock-out round spot).

On 2 May 2015, Manu captained Tonga in their 2015 Polynesian Cup test-match against Pacific rivals Samoa. On 17 October 2015 Manu captained Tonga again this time in their Asia-Pacific Qualifier match against the Cook Islands for the 2017 Rugby League World Cup.

On 7 May 2016, Manu traveled down from Hull to Sydney to captain Tonga in the 2016 Polynesian Cup against Samoa, where he started in the second row in the 18-6 loss at Parramatta Stadium.

In 2018 he announced his retirement from international rugby league.

References

External links

Hull F.C. profile
Penrith Panthers profile
SL profile
2017 RLWC profile

1987 births
Living people
Junior Kiwis players
Melbourne Storm players
New Zealand national rugby league team players
New Zealand sportspeople of Tongan descent
New Zealand rugby league players
Penrith Panthers players
People educated at Upper Hutt College
Petone Panthers players
Randwick Kingfishers players
Rugby league second-rows
Rugby league players from Lower Hutt
Tonga national rugby league team captains
Tonga national rugby league team players
Upper Hutt Tigers players